Website audit is a full analysis of all the factors that affect website's visibility in search engines. This standard method gives a complete insight into any website, overall traffic and individual pages. Website audit is completed solely for marketing purposes. The goal is to detect weak points in campaigns that affect web performance.

Description

The website audit starts from a general analysis of a website aimed at revealing the actions needed to improve search engine optimization (SEO). Many tools offer recommendations on how to raise the website rankings in search that can include on-page and off-page SEO audits such as broken links, duplicate meta descriptions and titles, HTML validation, website statistics, error pages, indexed pages, and site speed. Site audit is applicable for all online businesses and improves different aspects of the websites.

Purpose

There are many reasons to do a website audit, but in most cases SEO and content marketing are the main ones. Website audit made for SEO purposes discovers weak spots of a website's SEO score and helps understand the state of SEO. Content audit is used to analyze the engagement and what changes have to be made to the content strategy to enhance the site's performance.

Types

There are multiple types of site audits, including the following:
 Website health audits - analyzing overall health of the website while revealing all issues that require immediate attention.
 Security audits - accessing a site for potential vulnerability issues such as high value sites and high-risk verticals.
 Competitive site audits - the ability to monitor all gaps and opportunities for website promotion, and detect the benefits and drawbacks of competitors.
 Red flag and recovery audits - analyzing a website for impending penalties and site metrics when there is an oncoming peril of algorithmic penalties.
 Conversion optimization audits - accessing a site for possible technical and onsite conversion problems.
 Technical SEO audits - this often involves crawling the entire site, beginning with a review of site content, structure, and adherence to best practices such as web accessibility.

All of these audits can form a part of the same audit. Each one is made to make sure that you have powerful and reliable system in place. It shows the unidentified dangers that can bring you down, tells what needs to change and what's working well and what's not good, and gives practical recommendations and insights into what need to prioritize more. All website audits start with site health audits.

See also 

 Technical audit
 Hyperlink
 Digital content

References

Website management
Marketing software